The genus Gloeophyllum is characterized by the production of leathery to corky tough, brown, shaggy-topped, revivable fruitbodies lacking a stipe and with a lamellate to daedaleoid or poroid fertile hymenial surfaces. The hyphal system is dimitic to trimitic. The genus is further characterized by the production of a brown rot of wood. Phylogenetically, it along with several other brown rot Basidiomycota, Neolentinus, Heliocybe, and Veluticeps form an order called the Gloeophyllales.

The most frequently encountered species in the Northern Hemisphere is Gloeophyllum sepiarium, which is commonly found in a dried state on both bark-covered and decorticated conifer stumps and logs, timbers on wharfs, planks on unpainted wooden buildings, wood bridges, and even creosoted railroad ties.

Pharmacology
An extract of Gleophyllum odoratum exhibits high inhibitory activity on thrombin and trypsin as well as cysteine protease.

References

Gloeophyllales
Agaricomycetes genera